The Ottawa Rail Bridge is a railroad bridge spanning the Illinois River in the municipality of Ottawa, LaSalle County, Illinois. The first rail crossing on this site was constructed in 1871 by the Chicago, Burlington and Quincy Railroad, along a route leased from the Ottawa, Oswego and Fox River Valley Railroad between Ottawa and Streator, Illinois. The current bridge was constructed in 1898 by the King Bridge Company and altered in 1932 to include a vertical-lift span designed by Waddell & Harrington. The Illinois Railway now operates trains over the bridge on its Ottawa Branch between Streator and Montgomery, Illinois.

See also
List of bridges documented by the Historic American Engineering Record in Illinois

References

External links

Bridges in LaSalle County, Illinois
Historic American Engineering Record in Illinois
Bridges over the Illinois River
Railroad bridges in Illinois
Truss bridges in the United States
Steel bridges in the United States
Vertical lift bridges in the United States
Bridges completed in 1898
1898 establishments in Illinois